Sight Unseen is a 1969 thriller novel by the British writer Audrey Erskine Lindop.

References

Bibliography
 Vinson, James. Twentieth-Century Romance and Gothic Writers. Macmillan, 1982.

1969 British novels
Novels by Audrey Erskine Lindop
British thriller novels
William Collins, Sons books